Timur Magomedovich Gadzhikhanov (born 5 June 1995 in Kazan, Russia) is a Russian curler from Moscow.

He played second for the Russian national men's curling team at the 2016 European Curling Championships.

Awards 
 World Junior Curling Championships: Silver (2013).
 European Junior Curling Challenge: Gold (2015), Silver (2012).
 Russian Men's Junior Championship (U-18): Gold (2011/12), Bronze (2008/09, 2009/10).
 Russian Men's Junior Championship (U-21): Gold (2010/11, 2011/12), Silver (2012/13, 2013/14).
 Russian Mixed Doubles Curling Cup: Silver (2016).
 Russian Men's Curling Championship: Gold (2014), Silver (2015).
 Russian Men's Curling Cup: Gold (2013, 2014).
 Russian Men's SuperCup: Gold (2016).
 Russian Mixed Curling Championship: Gold (2014).
 Master of Sports of Russia.

Personal life

Teammates
2016 European Curling Championships
 Alexey Timofeev, Fourth, Skip
 Alexey Stukalskiy, Third
 Artur Ali, Lead
 Artur Razhabov, Alternate

References

External links 
 

Living people
1995 births
Russian male curlers
Curlers from Moscow
Sportspeople from Kazan
Competitors at the 2017 Winter Universiade